Andrey Alekhin (born February 9, 1959, Novosibirsk) is a Russian political figure and a deputy of the 8th State Duma.
 
After graduating from the Novosibirsk State Technical University, Alekhin moved to Omsk where he started working at the tannery factory. From 1983 to 1985, he was the second secretary of the Kirov district committee of the Komsomol. In 1989–1991, he was the head of the ideological department of the Kirov district committee of the Communist Party of the Soviet Union. After the suspension of the CPSU in 1991, Alekhin started working at the administrative and technical inspection of Omsk. From 1994 to 2021, he was the deputy of the Legislative Assembly of Omsk Oblast of the 1st, 2nd, 3rd, 4th, 5th, and 6th convocations. From 2000 to 2021, he was also the second secretary of the Omsk regional committee of the Communist Party of the Russian Federation. Since September 2021, he has served as deputy of the 8th State Duma from the Omsk Oblast constitution.

References
 

 

1959 births
Living people
Communist Party of the Russian Federation members
21st-century Russian politicians
Eighth convocation members of the State Duma (Russian Federation)
Politicians from Omsk